Executive orders issued by presidents of the United States to help officers and agencies of the executive branch manage operations within the community.

At the federal level of government in the United States, laws are made almost exclusively by legislation.  Such legislation originates as an Act of Congress passed by the United States Congress; such acts were either signed into law by the president or passed by Congress after a presidential veto.

So, legislation is not the only source of regulations. There is also judge-made common law and constitutional law. The president can issue executive orders pursuant to a grant of discretion from Congress, or under the inherent powers that office holds to deal with certain matters which have the force of law.

Many early executive orders were not recorded. The State Department began numbering executive orders in the early 20th century, starting retroactively from President Abraham Lincoln's Executive Order Establishing a Provisional Court in Louisiana issued in 1862.

Consolidated list by president

1800s
 1836: Specie Circular - Required payment for public lands be in gold and silver specie
 1863: Proclamation of Amnesty and Reconstruction -  Laid out President Lincoln's preliminary plan for reintegrating the "states in rebellion" back into the Union
 1872: Colville Indian Reservation is created

Earliest numbered executive orders 
The current numbering system for executive orders was established by the U.S. State Department in 1907, when all of the orders in the department's archives were assigned chronological numbers. The first executive order to be assigned a number was Executive Order 1, signed by Abraham Lincoln in 1862, but hundreds of unnumbered orders had been signed by presidents going back to George Washington.

Grover Cleveland (1885–1889, 1893–1897)

First presidency (1885–1889)

Second presidency (1893–1897)

Benjamin Harrison (1889–1893)

William McKinley (1897–1901)

Theodore Roosevelt (1901–1909) 

 1901–1909: Executive Orders by President Theodore Roosevelt: Complete list of executive orders by President Theodore Roosevelt

William Howard Taft (1909–1913)

Woodrow Wilson (1913–1921) 

 1914: Executive Order 1888: Providing conditions of employment for the Permanent Force for the Panama Canal
 1918: Executive Order 2859: National Research Council of the National Academy of Sciences

Warren G. Harding (1921–1923)

Calvin Coolidge (1923–1929) 

 1927: Executive Order 4601: Authorization of the Distinguished Flying Cross

Herbert Hoover (1929–1933)

Franklin D. Roosevelt (1933–1945) 

Administration of Franklin D. Roosevelt Executive Orders Disposition Tables

Harry S. Truman (1945–1953) 

Administration of Harry S Truman Executive Orders Disposition Tables

Dwight D. Eisenhower (1953–1961) 

Administration of Dwight D. Eisenhower Executive Orders Disposition Tables

EOs 10432–10913
 1953: Executive Order 10450: Charged the heads of federal agencies and the Office of Personnel Management, supported by the Federal Bureau of Investigation (FBI), with investigating federal employees to determine whether they posed security risks.
 1954: Executive Order 10555: Establishing a Seal for the President's Committee on Employment of the Physically Handicapped
 1959: : Defined the design of the flag of the United States

John F. Kennedy (1961–1963) 

Administration of John F. Kennedy Executive Orders Disposition Tables

 1961: Executive Order 10924: Established the Peace Corps.
 1961: Executive Order 10925: Required government contractors to "take affirmative action" to ensure non-discriminatory employment practices. Created the Equal Employment Opportunity Commission

 1962: Executive Order 10988 recognizes the right of federal workers to join employee organizations and bargain collectively
 1962: Executive Order 10990 reestablished the Federal Safety Council
 1962: Executive Order 11051 was revoked by Executive Order 12148: Specifies the duties and responsibilities of the Office of Emergency Planning and gives authorization to put all executive orders into effect in times deemed to be of increased international tension, economic crisis, and/or financial crisis
 1963: Executive Order 11110: Delegating the authority to issue silver certificates under the Agricultural Adjustment Act of May 12, 1933 to the Secretary of the Treasury
 1963: Executive Order 11111: Federalized the Alabama National Guard in response to the Stand in the Schoolhouse Door.

Lyndon B. Johnson (1963–1969) 

Administration of Lyndon B. Johnson Executive Orders Disposition Tables

EOs 11128–11451

 1963: Executive Order 11129: Decreed on November 29, 1963 that the NASA Launch Operations Center (LOC), including facilities on Merritt Island and Cape Canaveral, would be renamed the John F. Kennedy Space Center, NASA. That name change officially took effect on December 20, 1963
 1963: Executive Order 11130:  Created Warren Commission to investigate the assassination of president Kennedy
 1964: Executive Order 11141: Declaring a public policy against discriminating on the basis of age
 1965: Executive Order 11246: Prohibited discrimination in employment decisions on the basis of race, color, religion, sex, or national origin
 1966: Executive Order 11310: Assigned Emergency Preparedness Functions to the Attorney General

Richard Nixon (1969–1974) 

Administration of Richard Nixon Executive Orders Disposition Tables

EOs 11452–11797

 1969: Executive Order 11478: Prohibiting discrimination based on race, color, religion, sex, national origin, handicap, or age in the competitive service of the federal civilian workforce, which includes civilians employed by the armed forces and by federal contractors and contractors performing under federally assisted construction contracts. Some categories were added by Executive Order 13087 in 1998 and Executive Order 13152 in 2000.

Gerald R. Ford (1974–1977) 

EOs 11798–11966

 1975: Executive Order 11850: Renunciation of certain uses in war of chemical herbicides and riot control agents.
 1976: Executive Order 11905: Outlawed the use of political assassination.
 1976: Executive Order 11921: Allows the Federal Emergency Preparedness Agency to develop plans to establish control over the mechanisms of production, distribution, energy sources, wages, salaries, credit, and the flow of money.

Jimmy Carter (1977–1981) 

Administration of Jimmy Carter Executive Orders Disposition Tables

EOs 11967–12286
 1977: Executive Order 11967: Implemented Proclamation 4483, pardoning draft evaders of the Vietnam War
 1978: Executive Order 12036: Reformed the Intelligence Community and further banned assassination.
 1979: Executive Order 12148: Established the Federal Emergency Management Agency (FEMA)
 1979: Executive Order 12170: Allows the freezing of all Iranian assets held within the United States
 1979: Executive Order 12172: Iranian aliens delegation of entry into the United States

Ronald Reagan (1981–1989) 

Administration of Ronald Reagan Executive Orders Disposition Tables

 1981: Executive Order 12333: Strengthened management of the United States Intelligence Community
 1982: Executive Order 12372: Intergovernmental Review of federal programs
 1987: Executive Order 12601: President's Commission on the HIV Epidemic
 1988: Executive Order 12656: Assignment of Emergency Preparedness Responsibilities
 1988: Executive Order 12631: Working Group on Financial Markets
 1989: Executive Order 12667: Establishes procedure for access to Presidential Records.  (Revoked by Executive Order 13233, November 1, 2001. Restored by Executive Order on January 21, 2009.)

George H. W. Bush (1989–1993) 

Administration of George Bush Executive Orders Disposition Tables

Bill Clinton (1993–2001) 

Administration of William J. Clinton Executive Orders Disposition Tables

George W. Bush (2001–2009) 

Administration of George W. Bush Executive Orders Disposition Tables

Barack Obama (2009–2017) 

Administration of Barack Obama Executive Orders Disposition Tables

Donald Trump (2017–2021)

Joe Biden (2021–present) 

.

See also 
 List of sources of law in the United States
 List of United States federal legislation
 Presidential directive

References

External links
National Archives and Records Administration:
 Executive Orders
 Disposition Tables of Executive Orders
 Codification of Executive Orders
 About Executive Orders
 A list of Executive Orders related to national security, and their texts, can be found at:
 Federation of American Scientists Intelligence Resource Program

Executive orders
 
United States federal policy